The Absent One is a 1997 Canadian experimental film written and directed by Céline Baril.

The idea for the film was inspired by Baril's discovery in a Paris flea market of a dusty old photo album. Interior scenes, and all exteriors of European cities, including Rome, Vienna, Budapest and Prague, as well as glimpses (footage) of old B&W photos of a family, were shot in 8 mm and blown up to 16 mm for effect.

Synopsis 
This film tells the story of Paul Kadar, an architect and musician who, en route to Budapest, is overcome by vertigo while contemplating the Danube and throws himself into it. It is an account of the happiness shared by Paul Kadar, his wife Françoise
and Roland, their adopted son. Years later, Roland, still unclear as to the circumstances that led his father to drown himself in the Danube, heads to Europe to find out for himself. His journey takes him to such places as Budapest, Warsaw, Prague and even as far as Tokyo.

Cast 
Roland Bréard as Roland Kadar
Bobo Vian as Hungarian Interviewer

Reception 
In August 1997, Brendan Kelly of Variety wrote, "With its snail-like pacing, sub-par acting and underwhelming emotional impact, "The Absent One" is not likely to stir up much interest," and concludes with "Baril moves what little story there is along at an extremely slow speed, further straining viewer patience."

See also 
1997 Toronto International Film Festival/Perspective Canada

References

External links 

L' Absent at TIFFG Film reference library
revue24images, L'absent (de Céline Baril)
Ritsumeikan University database

Canadian avant-garde and experimental films
Quebec films
1997 films
1990s avant-garde and experimental films
1990s French-language films
French-language Canadian films
1990s Canadian films